Malakat may refer to:

 Kakaki, metal trumpets used in the traditional musics of various African cultures
 Ma malakat aymanukum, an Arabic phrase that appears in the Qur'an